The Smooth Collie is a breed of dog developed originally for herding. It is a short-coated version of the Rough Collie of Lassie fame. Some breed organisations consider the smooth-coat and rough-coat dogs to be variations of the same breed.

History

The early history of the Smooth Collie, like that of many dog breeds, is a matter of speculation. Even the origin of the breed's name is unclear, variously claimed to describe the early shepherd dog's dark colour ("coaly") or derived from the name of a breed of sheep with black faces once commonly kept in Scotland ("Colley") or derived from an Anglo-Saxon word meaning "useful." The word could also trace to Gaelic or/and Irish - in which the words for "doggie" are, respectively, càilean and coileán. This would be more consistent with the breed's origin in the Gaelic-speaking Scottish Highlands than an Anglo-Saxon term.

The modern history of both the Smooth and Rough Collie began in the reign of Queen Victoria, who became interested in the shepherds' dogs while at Balmoral Castle in Scotland. In 1860, she purchased some of the dogs for her own kennel. With the Queen's interest, it became fashionable to own Smooth Collies. Thus began the breed's transformation from working farm dog, similar to the modern Border collie, to the dog bred as a pet and for the sport of conformation showing that we know today.

The Smooth Collie today is considered a variety of the same breed as the Rough Collie in the United States, Canada, meaning that they can interbreed and some statistics are kept only for "Collie" rather than for both varieties individually. The smooth and rough are classified as separate breeds in other countries, such as the United Kingdom, and Australia. The latter is a fairly recent development, however, with the Kennel Club (UK) allowing the interbreeding of the two varieties until 1993.

Description

Appearance

The Smooth Collie is slightly longer than it is tall, with a level back and a deep chest. The features of the head, particularly the "sweet" expression, are considered very important in the show ring. The breed has a long muzzle, flat skull, and semi-erect ears (although, in practice, the ears typically must be folded over and taped in puppyhood, or they will usually be fully upright in the adult dog).

Coat
The coat consists of a soft, extremely dense undercoat and straight, harsh outer guard hairs. The guard hairs are one to two inches long, with the longer hair mainly in a ruff around the neck and on the backs of the thighs. The coat requires a thorough weekly brushing. Shedding is moderate most of the year, heavy during the twice-yearly shedding season.

Colour
Smooth Collies come in four colours:  sable (Lassie's colour; can be light gold to deep mahogany); tricolour (black, with tan and white markings); and blue merle (silvery gray marbled with black, and tan markings), all marked with white areas on the chest, neck, feet/legs, and tail tip. An additional colour is white (these Collies are predominantly white, with heads and usually a body spot of sable, tri, or blue colour), although this is not a recognized colour in the United Kingdom, the breed's country of origin.  Blue eyes or merled eyes in a non-blue merle collie are not disqualifications in the AKC standard although they are heavily penalized. There are, however, plenty of blue-eyed or merled-eyed sable merle collies who are AKC breed champions.

Temperament

The Smooth Collie is generally a sociable, easily trained family dog. Although not an aggressive breed, they are alert and vocal, making them both good watchdogs if well trained and potential nuisances if allowed to bark indiscriminately. Collies are agile and active dogs and need regular exercise in some way.  This breed is easy to train, due to its high intelligence and eagerness to please its owners. Training this breed requires a light touch, as they are sensitive to correction and shy away from harsh treatment. They get along well with children and other animals, usually getting along with other dogs. Smooth Collies are used both as family pets and in obedience competition, agility, herding trials, and other dog sports. Some are still used as working sheepdogs. They are also very useful as assistance dogs for the disabled.

Health
The Smooth Collie is a long-lived breed for its size, usually living 12 to 14 years. Like all dog breeds, they are susceptible to certain inherited or partially inherited health problems. Those problems currently include:
Collie eye anomaly (CEA): A collection of eye problems ranging from minor blood vessel abnormalities to blind spots to severely deformed or detached retinas. This problem is so widespread in collies that completely unaffected dogs (called "normal eyed") are uncommon, although conscientious breeders have been able to gradually increase the normal population. The problem and its extent can be determined through an eye exam conducted before six weeks of age, and does not get worse over time. Mildly affected dogs suffer no impairments, and are fine pets or working dogs.
Progressive retinal atrophy: Gradual degeneration of the retinas of the eyes, eventually leading to blindness. This disease is less common than CEA in Collies, but more difficult to breed away from, as symptoms are not usually detectable until the affected dog is middle-aged or older.
Multidrug sensitivity (MDR1): Sometimes fatal reactions to a class of common drugs, particularly ivermectin, used as a heartworm preventative and treatment for mites. The gene that causes this sensitivity has recently been identified, and a dog's susceptibility can now be determined through a simple blood test.
Gastric dilatation volvulus (bloat): A painful and often fatal twisting of the stomach occurring in large or deep-chested breeds which can usually be prevented by feeding small meals and not allowing vigorous exercise immediately before or after eating.
Epilepsy: Seizures of unknown origin. Frequency of the seizures can often be significantly reduced through medication, but there is no cure for this disease.
Cyclic Neutropenia: CN is also known as Gray Collie Syndrome. Cyclic Neutropenia is a disease that affects the neutrophils of a dog, which are an integral part of the dog's immune system. Most affected dogs will die as puppies, and even with the best care, the dog will not likely live past 2–3 years of age.

Work and sports 
Smooth Collies can compete in dog agility trials, obedience, showmanship, flyball, tracking, search and rescue (SAR), assistance dog and herding events. Herding instincts and trainability can be measured at noncompetitive herding tests. Collies exhibiting basic herding instincts can be trained to compete in herding trials.

See also
 Dogs portal
 List of dog breeds
Collie

References

Further reading
Clark, Stella. Rough and Smooth Collies. Letchworth (UK): Ringpress Books, Ltd., 1993.
Collie Club of America. The New Collie. New York: Howell Book House, 1983.
Welton, Michelle. Your Purebred Puppy: a buyer's guide. New York: Henry Holt & Company, 2000.
Dorsten, Cindy.  ‘’A Celebration of the Working Collie’’. Alpine Publications, c. 2002.

External links

The Smooth Collie Club of Great Britain
Health and Wellbeing Facebook Community

FCI breeds
Herding dogs
Dog breeds originating in Scotland
Vulnerable Native Breeds